Eucalyptus ecostata, commonly known as coastal silver mallee, is a species of mallee that is endemic to the south coast of Western Australia. It has smooth greyish bark, lance-shaped to curved adult leaves, flower buds in groups of between eleven and fifteen, creamy white flowers and more or less hemispherical but flattened fruit.

Description

Taxonomy and naming
This eucalypt was first formally described in 1911 by Joseph Maiden who gave it the name Eucalyptus falcata var. ecostata and published the description in Journal and proceedings of the Natural History and Science Society of Western Australia. In 2012 Dean Nicolle and Malcolm French raised the variety to species status. The specific epithet (ecostata) means "without ribs".

Distribution and habitat
This mallee grows in mallee shrubland in a variety of soils and in found in near-coastal areas of Western Australia between the Stirling Range and Stokes Inlet and as far inland as the Ravensthorpe Range, in the Esperance Plains, Jarrah Forest and Mallee biogeographic regions.

Conservation status
Eucalyptus ecostatais classified as "not threatened" by the Western Australian Government Department of Parks and Wildlife.

References

Eucalypts of Western Australia
Myrtales of Australia
ecostata
Mallees (habit)
Plants described in 1911
Taxa named by Joseph Maiden